Minorca is the older English name for Menorca, one of the Balearic Islands located in the Mediterranean Sea and belonging to Spain.

Minorca may also refer to:
Minorca, large residential area of New Smyrna Beach, Florida 
Minorca, Louisiana, a community in the United States
Minorca, Isle of Man, an area of Laxey village on the Isle of Man
Minorca Halt, a stop on the Manx Electric Railway
Minorca (1799 ship), a ship used to transport convicts to Sydney arriving on 14 December 1801
Minorca chicken, a breed of domestic chicken originating in the Mediterranean island of Menorca

See also